Knockholt railway station is on the South Eastern Main Line, located in the London Borough of Bromley, Greater London. It is in Travelcard Zone 6 and is located next to the Greater London boundary with the Kent district of Sevenoaks. The boundary is the farm bridge at the southern end of the platforms.

Location 
To avoid confusion with Halstead in Essex it was named after the next closest village.

Services 

The typical off-peak service in trains per hour is:
 2 tph to London Charing Cross via  and 
 2 tph to 

History

When the South Eastern Railway (SER) opened their "cut off" line through Orpington, Sevenoaks to Tonbridge in 1868, there was no station between Chelsfield and Dunton Green. A Knockholt Vestry meeting in March 1871 resolved to request the SER to build a station for Knockholt but this request was initially refused. Eventually, the SER agreed to provide a station if a £3,000 contribution was provided by "local parties,". This was raised and "Halstead for Knockholt" (the station being much closer to Halstead than Knockholt) was opened in 1876.

Between 1887 and 1915 a twice daily bus service operated from Knockholt village to the station.

In 1899 the SER joined with its arch rival to form the South Eastern and Chatham Railway (SECR). Alfred Smithers, who had moved to Knockholt in 1881, became deputy chairman of the SECR. At the strong suggestion of Smithers, the station name was changed to "Knockholt" in 1900 to avoid the confusion which had arisen with Halstead Station in Essex (and coincidentally giving Smithers a local station named after his village).

References

External links 

Railway stations in the London Borough of Bromley
DfT Category E stations
Former South Eastern Railway (UK) stations
Railway stations in Great Britain opened in 1876
Railway stations served by Southeastern